The Miss Perú 1958 pageant was 4th edition held on July 5, 1958. That year, 16 candidates were competing for the national crown. The winner represented Peru at the Miss Universe 1958. The rest of the finalists would enter different pageants.

Placements

Special Awards

 Best Regional Costume - Apurímac - Marilú Alvarez
 Miss Photogenic - Tacna - Teresa Rubina
 Miss Congeniality - Tumbes - Irma Málaga
 Miss Elegance - Distrito Capital - Beatriz Dulanto

.

Delegates

Amazonas - Silvia Salinas
Apurímac - Marilú Alvarez
Cajamarca - Victoria Pilcon
Callao - Techy Hurtado
Distrito Capital - Beatriz Dulanto 
Ica - Gladys Carbajal
Junín - Doris Castro
La Libertad - Martha Mantilla

Loreto - Violeta López
Moquegua - Rebeca Romero
Piura - Nannie Berendson
Puno - Catty Arteaga
Region Lima - Beatriz Boluarte
Tacna - Teresa Rubina
Tumbes - Irma Málaga
USA Peru -  Claudia Orson

.

References

Miss Peru
1958 in Peru
1958 beauty pageants